The Pennsylvania Constitution of 1776 (ratified September 28, 1776) was the state's first constitution following their declaration of independence and has been described as the most democratic in America. It was drafted by Robert Whitehill, Timothy Matlack, Dr. Thomas Young, George Bryan, James Cannon, and Benjamin Franklin. Pennsylvania's innovative and highly democratic government structure, featuring a unicameral legislature and collective executive, may have influenced the later French Republic's formation under the French Constitution of 1793. The constitution also included a declaration of rights that coincided with the Virginia Declaration of Rights of 1776.

Background
Pennsylvania's new constitution was tied to ongoing political changes within the province in 1776. As the Revolution evolved, the views of some political leaders differed from those of the Provincial Assembly (and its supporters) and of the Deputy Governor, John Penn. Extralegal committees were established that would eventually displace and take over the government.

For example in June 1774, after Governor Penn refused to convene the Assembly to consider the question of discussing some action to the British government’s response to the Boston Tea Party, a public meeting held under the leadership of John Dickinson and Thomas Willing inspired 8,000 people in Philadelphia to call for the First Continental Congress and the establishment of a committee of correspondence to communicate with the other colonies. Although these measures were subsequently adopted by the Assembly, other public-action committees that had been supported by large public demonstrations (with attendees numbering in the thousands) outpaced Assembly action, for example establishing a military association for defense (though this action was later validated by the Assembly’s establishment of the Committee of Safety). In May 1776, the Second Continental Congress called for dispensing with Royal Governors and Assemblies that did not act with the groups (parties) opposing the Crown. The Pennsylvania Provincial Conference in June 1776 resolved “that the present Assembly of the Colony is ‘not competent to the exigencies of affairs’ and that a Provincial Convention ought to be called for inaugurating a form of Colonial government, in compliance with the recommendation of Congress”.  

Until this point, many influential leaders in Pennsylvania had not supported independence from the Crown, but had favored reconciliation.  The Continental Congress, however, inspired the more radical elements in Pennsylvania to overmaster these more conservative leaders. Shortly afterwards, in June 1776, these committees called a state convention, which met on July 15, 1776. The decisions made at that convention would, when ratified, cause the previous government to be completely superseded; it established a Council of Safety to rule in the interim, and it drew up the commonwealth (state) constitution, which was adopted on September 28, 1776. The change of government, was, however, opposed by many of the commonwealth’s citizens - John Dickinson, James Wilson, Robert Morris, and Frederick Muhlenberg, among others. 

The constitutional convention met in Philadelphia and elected Benjamin Franklin, president, Colonel George Ross, vice-president, John Morris, secretary, and Jacob Garrigues, assistant-secretary. From its inception, the convention arrogated to itself the interim political power of the state. The constitution was completed on September 28, at which time it was read in convention for the last time, signed by the president and members, and transmitted to the Committee of Safety, with directions to deliver it to the general assembly of the state at their first meeting, immediately after they should have chosen their speaker. The first meeting of the Pennsylvania General Assembly took place on November 28, 1776. Thomas Wharton Jr., who had been the President of the Committee of Safety, was chosen as President of the Supreme Executive Council in June 1777 and became, in effect, the first Governor of the Commonwealth.

Innovations

It contained several innovations that were quite radical for that era, including:

 Voting franchise for all men who had paid taxes, an innovation because it was somewhat less restrictive than a requirement that voters own property.
 A unicameral legislature, with members elected for one term.
 A twelve-member Supreme Executive Council to administer the government.
 A judiciary appointed by the legislature for seven-year terms, removable at any time.
 The provision that all approved legislation would take effect only at the next session of the Assembly, so the people of the state could assess the utility of the proposed law.
 A President elected by the Assembly and Council together. Thomas Wharton Jr. was chosen in 1777 to be the first President of the Supreme Executive Council.
 A Council of Censors (elected every seven years) to conduct an evaluation of the activities of the state government. It could censure actions by the government, order impeachments and recommend to the legislature the repeal of laws that appeared to violate the constitution. The Council of Censors was the only body with the authority to call a convention to amend the constitution.

The constitution also established Pennsylvania's official title, the "Commonwealth of Pennsylvania." Three other states (Kentucky, Massachusetts, and Virginia) are presently self-designated as "commonwealths." Additionally, the constitution served as a template for Vermont's 1777 constitution, which gave birth to the state (or what historians refer to as the Vermont Republic, because claim over the land was disputed by both New York and New Hampshire, until it was formally admitted into the Union in 1791).

See also
 Frame of Government of Pennsylvania
 Uniform Firearms Act

References

External links
Avalon Project's Copy of the 1776 Pennsylvania Constitution
Zinn, Howard (date unknown). A People's History of the United States. Chapter 4: Tyranny is Tyranny. History Is A Weapon.

1776 in American law
Defunct state constitutions of the United States
Pennsylvania Constitutions
Pennsylvania in the American Revolution
1776 in Pennsylvania